Nisyrus or Nisyros was a town of ancient Greece on the island of Karpathos.

Its site is unlocated.

References

Populated places in the ancient Aegean islands
Former populated places in Greece
Lost ancient cities and towns